Songdo Beach is a man-made beach in Busan, South Korea. It was  created in 1913. The name "Songdo" (the Island of Pines) was given due to the thick pine forest covering the island. 

Songdo Beach was the first beach in Korea, and was developed by the Songdo Amusement Co., Ltd. In 1964, a cable car passed directly over the beach connecting Geobuk (Turtle) Island with Songdo, and a girder bridge linking Songlim Park with Geobuk Island were completed.

References

Busan
Beaches of South Korea